Aberdeen Science Centre is a science museum in Aberdeen, Scotland. It displays exhibits and performs fun, educational and interactive shows and workshops which are aimed to be inclusive for all audiences. It attracts primary school groups around the year and its exhibits are "hands on" so that everything can be played with and examined.  The centre is a registered charity under Scottish law. It is funded by the public and donations from local corporate sponsors. The attraction also contains a café.

It is located on Constitution Street. The building within which the attraction is located was once a depot for Aberdeen's tram network. It used to based on Justice Mill Lane. The centre was temporarily located at 107 George Street from 2018 to 2020 as it underwent a multimillion-pound renovation at its Constitution Street location. It was completed in Summer 2020.

History
The attraction, previously called Satrosphere, was opened in February 1990 in Justice Mill Lane. The opening was attended by Heather Couper. It was created by SATRO North Scotland and funded by Grampian Regional Council and donations. Prior to the opening of Satrosphere, SATRO North Scotland held temporary science exhibitions. It moved to its current premises in 2001.

During 2019, the centre was refurbished and a mezzanine floor was added to the building. During its renovation, the science centre was temporarily located on George Street. The refurbished centre reopened in November 2020.

See also
 Dynamic Earth - Science Centre in Edinburgh, Scotland.
 Glasgow Science Centre - Science Centre in Glasgow, Scotland.
 Dundee Science Centre - Science Centre in Dundee, Scotland.

References

External links

Museums in Aberdeen
Science centers in Scotland
Charities based in Scotland
Science and technology in Aberdeen
1990 establishments in Scotland